Christine Antoinette Charlotte Desmares (1682 – 12 September 1753), professionally known as Mlle Desmares, was a French stage actress. Scion of a notable comic actor family, she had an active stage career that spanned three decades, performing with the Comédie-Française from 1699 until her retirement in 1721; she was also remembered as a mistress of Philippe II, Duke of Orléans, Regent of France.

Life
She was born in Copenhagen to the comic actors Nicolas Desmares and Anne d'Ennebault and trained under her aunt la Champmeslé. She made her stage début aged sixteen with the Comédie-Française company on 30 January 1699 in Oreste et Pylade by Lagrange-Chancel. In only three months she became so successful that she was accepted as a sociétaire of the company to replace her aunt, who had left it in 1698. Succeeding her aunt as the company's leading actress, Desmares played tragic roles (such as Hermione in Andromaque by Jean Racine, Émilie in Cinna by Pierre Corneille, and Jocasta in Oedipus by Voltaire) as well as comedy ones (such as Lisette in Le Légataire universel by Regnard and Néréine in Le Curieux impertinent by Destouches); along with her company-mate and rival , Desmares was a follower of high, formal and oratorical style of acting that defined the Comédie-Française in the early 18th century. In light of the younger actress Adrienne Lecouvreur's success that followed her Comédie-Française debut in 1717, Desmares retired in Spring 1721, giving occasional private performances in her retirement; in years to come, she was succeeded by Lecouvreur and, later, by Marie-Anne Botot Dangeville.

Early in her career, she was a mistress to the King Louis XIV's son, the Grand Dauphin, and then to his nephew and son-in-law, the Duke of Chartres. With the latter, she had a daughter c. 1700–1702, named Angélique de Froissy by her father and married off to count Henri François de Ségur. She also built herself another mansion, La Folie Desmares in Châtillon, which still survives. She died in Saint-Germain-en-Laye in 1753.

Cultural depictions

In literature 
In the picaresque novel Gil Blas, Alain-René Lesage gives what, though disputed, is usually thought to be a literary portrait of Desmares:

In art 

In modern historiography, there are two portraits of Desmares regarded as authentic. One of them is a pastel by Charles-Antoine Coypel, dated to the 1720s, and published in 1733 as an etching by François-Bernard Lépicié; the pastel was mentioned in Desmares' inventory of 1746. In Coypel's pastel, now presumed lost, Desmares is shown holding a mask and a dagger, indicating her abilities in comedy and tragedy, stressed in the quatrain on Lépicié's print. An oil on canvas copy of the pastel, once attributed to Coypel and owned by the painter Pierre-Nolasque Bergeret, was acquired from the latter in 1827 by the Comédie-Française, where it remains. Another authentic portrait of Desmares, painted by Jacques Aved, was listed in Desmares' inventory of 1753; it then passed to her daughter Charlotte d'Amour, remaining until the latter's death in 1783.

Aside from aforementioned works, Desmares is also widely associated by scholars, to various success, with numerous paintings by contemporaneous artists such as Jean-Baptiste Santerre and Antoine Watteau. As for Santerre, it had been claimed as early as the late 1870s that his painting of the 1700s, Young Lady with a Letter, was a portrait of Desmares, with no concrete evidence to verify it though; in contrary to that point, it has been said that Santerre's subject does not at all resemble Desmares when compared with Coypel's pastel, and it is actually an imaginary figure in fancy dress, often present in Santerre's late-era art. There is also a wool and silk tapestry after design by Santerre, similar to Young Lady with a Letter, in the Metropolitan Museum of Art, New York City, showing a woman in fancy dress holding a mask, once identified as Desmares. Another portrait presumed to be of Desmares, attributed to Jean Raoux, was in the writer Arsène Houssaye's collection, sold in 1896.

As for Watteau, it has been speculated by scholars that he had some connection to the actress. According to the Soviet scholar Inna Nemilova, Watteau was a life-long admirer of Desmares, to whom and her company-mates he was allegedly introduced by a friend, the librettist Antoine de Laroque; in an article published in the 1984–1985 exhibition catalogue Watteau, 1684–1721, the French theatre historian François Moureau says that Desmares also "had numerous reasons for meeting Watteau." It was long noted that a print by Louis Desplaces after Watteau, showing a woman dressed as pilgrim, has been captioned with Desmares' name; along with Coypel's pastel, it was also said to be an authentic portrait of Desmares. The figure appeared in Watteau's early painting, The Isle of Cythera now in the Städel, Frankfurt, notably related to Florent Carton Dancourt's play The Three Cousins that was believed to feature Desmares as Colette, a pilgrim; a developed version of the subject appears in the lower left corner of Watteau's signature painting, The Embarkation for Cythera. Other paintings by Watteau believed to depict Desmares include The Coquettes, dit Actors of the Comédie-Française, The Dreamer, Fêtes Vénitiennes, and Love in the French Theatre. The supposed connection between Watteau and Desmares became a topic of the 2007 French film on the painter, .

Notes

References

Bibliography 

  .

External links
 Charlotte Desmares at the Comédie-Française official website 
 Biographie sur le site de l'Hôtel de Villeroy 

17th-century French actresses
18th-century French actresses
French stage actresses
1682 births
1753 deaths
Sociétaires of the Comédie-Française
Mistresses of Philippe II, Duke of Orléans